Mickey Sholdar (born March 20, 1949 in Indianapolis, Indiana) is an American actor.

Sholdar's credits include the role of Eddie Stander, with Ed Asner in Alfred Hitchcock Presents episode "To Catch a Butterfly"; also as son “Tommy Bassop” in a 1964 Gunsmoke episode titled "The Bassops", and a regular role as Steven Morley in the TV series The Farmer's Daughter (1963–66), and several appearances in Dragnet 1967.

He was also the golf technical advisor for the 1975 film Babe, the life story of Babe Zaharias, and appeared on-screen as a golf pro. This was his last film or TV part to date.

Another credit was on Route 66, appearing in the eleventh episode of season 3 entitled "Hey, Moth, Come Eat the Flame", which aired on November 30, 1962. In the episode, Sholdar plays a young boy trying to cope with the alcoholism of his piano-playing widower father (Harry Guardino) who was also being tempted into participating in a payroll heist.

References

Bibliography

External links

Living people
1949 births
American male child actors
American male television actors